Le Mans (French: Gare du Mans) is a railway station serving the town Le Mans, Sarthe department, western France. It is situated on the Paris–Brest railway, Le Mans–Angers railway and the non-electrified Tours–Le Mans railway.

Services
The following services call at Le Mans:
regional services (TER Centre-Val de Loire) Paris - Chartres - Le Mans
regional services (TER Pays de la Loire) Nantes - Angers - Sablé-sur-Sarthe - Le Mans
local services (TER Pays de la Loire) Laval - Le Mans
local services (TER Pays de la Loire) Le Mans - Nogent-le-Rotrou
local services (TER Pays de la Loire) Le Mans - Nogent-le-Rotrou
local services (TER Normandie) Le Mans - Château-sur-Loir - Tours

Intermodality 
The station is connected with T1 and T2 tramways, and with T3, 13, 14, 16, 30, 32, 34 et 35 local bus from SETRAM network.

The station is also connected with 26, 206, 207, 208, 209, 210, 211, 212, 214, 215, 216, 217, 218 and 219 regional Aléop bus.

References

Railway stations in Pays de la Loire
Railway stations in France opened in 1854